Basketball at the 1992 Summer Olympics was the thirteenth appearance of the sport of basketball as an official Olympic medal event. It included the sport of basketball's men's and women's competitions of the 1992 Summer Olympics. The games were played at the Pavelló Olímpic de Badalona. 12 men's teams and 8 women's teams participated in the tournament.

This was the first time that NBA players were eligible to play in Summer Olympics basketball, following a decision of FIBA in April 1989. Until 1992, only amateurs and players from professional leagues other than the NBA were allowed to play.

The United States men's team, which was nicknamed "The Dream Team", won the gold medal by beating Croatia in the men's final, with Lithuania winning the bronze medal. A documentary film, The Other Dream Team, covered the progress of the Lithuanian team.

The Unified Team, representing the Commonwealth of Independent States, of the recently defunct Soviet Union, won the women's tournament, with China as runner-up. The United States women's team won the bronze medal after losing to the CIS in the semifinal, suffering their third and last defeat to date in the Olympic basketball history.

The men's top scorer was Oscar Schmidt with 198 points in 8 games, with an average of 24.7 points, and Drazen Petrovic was second with 187 points in 7 games, with an average of 26.7 points.

Medal summary

Qualification
An NOC may enter up to one men's team with 12 players and up to one women's team with 12 players. For the men's tournament, the host country qualified automatically, as did the winners of the continental championships held for Asia, Oceania, Africa and the Americas, plus the runner-up, third  and fourth place from the Americas competitions. A special qualifying tournament was held for European teams to allocate four extra berths. For the women's tournament, the host team qualified automatically, as did the top three teams from the 1990 FIBA World Championship. A qualifying tournament was held to allocate four extra berths. Yugoslavia was replaced by Italy (the fifth place team from the qualifying tournament) after it was excluded from the Olympic tournament.

Men

Women

 Replaced Yugoslavia.

Format
Men's tournament:
 Two groups of six teams are formed, where the top four from each group advance to the knockout stage.
 Fifth and sixth places from each group form an additional bracket to decide 9th through 12th places in the final ranking.
 In the quarterfinals, the pairings are as follows: A1 vs. B4, A2 vs. B3, A3 vs. B2 and A4 vs. B1.
 The four teams eliminated from the quarterfinals form an additional bracket to decide 5th through 8th places in the final ranking.
 The winning teams from the quarterfinals meet in the semifinals.
 The winning teams from the semifinals contest the gold medal. The losing teams contest the bronze.

Women's tournament:
 Two groups of four teams are formed, where the top two from each group advance to the knockout stage.
 Third and fourth places from each group form an additional bracket to decide 5th–8th places in the final ranking.
 The winning teams from the semifinals contest the gold medal. The losing teams contest the bronze.

Tie-breaking criteria:
 Head to head results

Men's tournament

Preliminary round
The top four places in each of the preliminary round groups advanced to the eight team, single-elimination knockout stage, where Group A teams would meet Group B teams.

Group A

DAY 1

USA 116-48 Angola

Croatia 96-73 Brazil

Germany 83-74 Spain 

Day 2

USA 103-70 Croatia

Spain 101-100 Brazil

Germany 64-63 Angola

Day 3

USA 111-68 Germany

Croatia 88-79 Spain 

Angola 66-76 Brazil

Day 4

USA 127-83 Brazil

Croatia 98-74 Germany

Spain 63-83 Angola

Day 5

USA 122-81 Spain

Croatia 73-64 Angola

Germany 76-85 Brazil

Group B

Day 1

CIS 78-64  Venezuela 

Lithuania 112-75 China 

Puerto Rico  116-76 Australia 

Day 2

CIS 85-63  Australia 

Puerto Rico 100-68  China 

Venezuela  79-87  Lithuania 

Day 3

CIS 100-84  China 

Australia  78-71  Venezuela 

Lithuania  104-91  Πόρτο Ρίκο.  

Day 4

CIS 92-80  Lithuania 

Australia  88-66 China 

Puerto Rico  96-82  Venezuela 

Day 5

CIS  70-82  Puerto Rico 

Venezuela  96-88  China

Lithuania 98-87  Australia

Knockout stage

Women's tournament

Preliminary round
The best two teams from each group advanced to the semifinals. The United States and Cuba advanced undefeated through the group phase but couldn't reach the finals and ended up facing each other for the bronze medal instead.

Group A

Day 1

Cuba 91-89 CIS

Brazil 85-70 Italy

Day 2

CIS 77-67 Italy

Cuba 95-87 Brazil

Day 3

CIS 76-64 Brazil

Cuba 60-53 Italy

Group B

Day 1

USA 111-55 Czechoslovakia

China 66-63 Spain

Day 2

Spain 59-58 Czechoslovakia

USA 93-61 China

Day 3

China 72-70 Czechoslovakia

USA 114-58 Spain

Knockout stage

Final standings

See also
"The Dream Team"

References

External links
 Official Olympic Report

 
1992 in basketball
Basketball
1992
International basketball competitions hosted by Spain
International basketball competitions hosted by Catalonia